The Golden Chariot is a luxury tourist train that connects the important tourist spots in the Indian states of Karnataka, Goa, Kerala & Tamil Nadu as well as Puducherry, depending on the selected itinerary. The train is operated by the Karnataka State Tourism Development Corporation and The Maple Group handles the hospitality services on the train.

It is named after the Stone Chariot in the Vitthala Temple at Hampi. The Golden Chariot had its maiden commercial run on 10 March 2008, and generally runs weekly during the months of October–March, departing on Sundays during the 2022-23 season. The train is designed on the lines of the more popular train Palace on Wheels.

History
When the success of Palace on Wheels reached the corridors of the Karnataka State Tourism and Development Corporation (KSTDC), it resulted in the signing of MOU between the state tourism board and the Indian Railways in 2002. Later the Integral Coach Factory (ICF) was assigned the task to give shape to this luxury train. Approximately 900 design layouts were prepared by the engineers before finalizing the design. 

Architect Kusum Pendse worked with a team of 200 carpenters to complete the designs of these railway coaches and the process took around 4 months to complete. 

On 23 January 2008, Golden Chariot was unveiled on the tracks veneered in classic colors of purple and gold symbolizing elegance and golden jubilee celebration of Karnataka. An inauguration ceremony was organized at the Yeshwanthpur Railway Station wherein the President of India Pratibha Devisingh Patil flagged off the train. On 10 March 2008, Golden Chariot started its maiden journey from Bengaluru to Goa.

In January 2020, The Golden Chariot was handed over by the Karnataka Tourism Department to the IRCTC for the purpose of operations and marketing.

Facilities
The train offers accommodation in 44 cabins in 18 coaches that are named after dynasties that ruled the region: Kadamba, Hoysala, Rashtrakuta, Ganga, Chalukya, Bahamani, Adil Shahi, Sangama, Satavahana, Yadukula and Vijayanagar.

The facilities also includes two restaurants, a lounge bar, conference room, gym and spa. It has onboard internet connectivity via a USB-stick, and satellite antennae providing live television service in the cabins.

Destinations
The Golden Chariot offers 3 itineraries:  Jewels of South, and Pride of Karnataka, each lasting 6 nights & 7 days, and Glimpses of Karnataka, lasting 3 nights & 4 days. It also offers a Dasara festival tour in the month of October.

Jewels of South 
Jewels of South offers a six day tour which departs from Bengaluru and visits Mysuru, Hampi, Kabini River, Hassan, Badami, and Goa, returning to Bengaluru. Mamallapuram has been added to the circuit.

Pride of Karnataka 
Pride of Karnataka departs Bengaluru and visits Bandipur, Mysuru, Dwarasamudra, Chikamgaluru,  Hampi,  Pattadakal & Aihole, and Goa, returning to Bengaluru.

Glimpses of Karnataka 
Glimpses of Karnataka departs Bengaluru and visits Bandipur, Mysuru, and Hampi, returning to Bengaluru.

Dasara Tour 
The department of tourism and the Karnataka State Tourism Development Corporation (KSTDC) launched the Dasara tour to showcase the festival.

Awards 
The train has been awarded the title of "Asia's Leading Luxury Train" at World Travel Awards, 2013.

See also 

Fairy Queen
Palace on Wheels
Royal Orient
Deccan Odyssey
Mahaparinirvan Express
Royal Rajasthan on Wheels
Maharajas' Express

References

External links 
 The Golden Chariot Website

Tourism in Karnataka
Rail transport in Karnataka
Luxury trains in India
Railway services introduced in 2008
Tourism in Goa
Rail transport in Goa
2008 establishments in India